In Greek mythology, Iynx was an Arcadian Oread nymph; a daughter of the god Pan and Echo. In popular myth, she used an enchantment to cast a spell on Zeus which caused him to fall in love with Io. In consequence of this, Hera metamorphosed her into the bird called iynx (Eurasian wryneck, Jynx torquilla).

Iynx toys were small metal or wooden discs rotated by pulling attached strings, in a manner similar to more modern button whirligig toys.

Mythology
Iynx was an Arcadian nymph and the daughter of Pan and Echo, or Peitho. She was the creator of a magical love-charm known as the iynx—a spinning wheel with a wryneck bird attached. Iynx used her enchantments to make Zeus fall in love with her or with the nymph Io. Hera was enraged and transformed her into a wryneck bird.

According to another story, she was a daughter of Pierus, and as she and her sisters had presumed to enter into a musical contest with the Muses, she was changed into the bird iynx. This bird, the symbol of passionate and restless love, was given by Aphrodite to Jason, who, by turning it round and pronouncing certain magic words, excited the love of Medea.

See also
 Jinx

Notes

References
 Antoninus Liberalis, The Metamorphoses of Antoninus Liberalis translated by Francis Celoria (Routledge 1992). Online version at the Topos Text Project.
 Entry for ἴυγξ in LSJ Greek Lexicon (via Perseus) – including magical uses of the word
 Pindar, Odes translated by Diane Arnson Svarlien. 1990. Online version at the Perseus Digital Library. Online version at the Perseus Digital Library.
 Pindar, The Odes of Pindar including the Principal Fragments with an Introduction and an English Translation by Sir John Sandys, Litt.D., FBA. Cambridge, MA., Harvard University Press; London, William Heinemann Ltd. 1937. Greek text available at the Perseus Digital Library. Greek text available at the Perseus Digital Library.

Deeds of Hera
Deeds of Zeus
Greek mythological witches
Metamorphoses into birds in Greek mythology
Oreads